Otaua or Ōtaua is the name of two different settlements in New Zealand:

Otaua, Northland
Otaua, Waikato